Yellow Rose of Texas is a box set of Ernest Tubb recordings from 1954 to 1960, released in 1993. It is a 5-CD box set and contains 150 songs. The set includes extensive liner notes, session notes and photographs.

Four songs include The Wilburn Brothers. Members of Tubb's backing and recording bands during these years included such musicians as Floyd Cramer, Grady Martin, Buddy Harman, Hank Garland, Billy Byrd, Dale Potter and Leon Rhodes.

Reception

In his Allmusic review, Bruce Eder describes Disc Two as "...more consistent in tone and content, mixing blues and midtempo ballads, most of which are compiled here for the very first time, including four priceless cuts pairing Tubb off with the Wilburn Brothers.

Personnel
Ernest Tubb – vocals, guitar
Doyle Wilburn – vocals
Teddy Wilburn – vocals
Owen Bradley – piano
Floyd Cramer – piano
Billy Byrd – guitar
J.K. Wilson – guitar
Hank Garland – guitar
Grady Martin – guitar
Leon Rhodes – guitar
Dale Potter – fiddle
Farris Coursey – drums
Buddy Harman – drums
Billy "Bun" Wilson – drums
Jack Drake – bass
Pete Drake – steel guitar
Bobby Garrett – steel guitar
Dickie Harris – steel guitar
Thomas Lee Jackson Jr. – fiddle
The Jordanaires – background vocals
Anita Kerr Singers – background vocals
Production notes:
Owen Bradley – producer
Paul Cohen – producer
Richard Weize – tape research
Matt Tunia – tape research
Bob Jones – mastering
John Strother – mixing
Mark Wilder – disc transfers
Randy Aronson – tape research
R.A. Andreas – photography, illustrations
Jerry Strobel – photography, illustrations

References

1993 compilation albums
Ernest Tubb compilation albums
Albums produced by Owen Bradley
Bear Family Records compilation albums